Josiah Johnson, Jr., (April 1832August 21, 1919) was a 19th-century American New York Sandy Hook maritime pilot. He was best known for being in the New York Sandy Hook piloting service for over 47 years. He piloted over 5,000 vessels in and out of the New York Harbor without an accident. Johnson was captain and owner of the pilot boat Edmund Blunt.

Early life

Josiah Johnson was born in Eastville, Virginia on May 4, 1832. He was the son of Obadiah Johnson and Leah Abdell. He married Virginia Johnson on June 17, 1854 in New York City. They had five children. His son, Captain Henry Clay Johnson (1859-1932) was also a New York Sandy Hook pilot. His father lost a leg by a cannon shot in the battle between the frigate Constitution and Guerier in Charleston Bay, during the War of 1812.

Career

In 1843, Johnson came to Brooklyn with his uncle, Josiah Johnson Sr. (1795-1871), who was a Sandy Hook pilot. Johnson followed his uncle in the pilot life and went out to sea on a pilot boat in 1844 when he was 12 years old. In 1846 he began his apprenticeship and after five years he received his license as a pilot in 1851 at 19 years old. He became a branch pilot in 1853. He was in the pilot service for forty-seven years. He piloted over 5,000 vessels in and out of the New York Harbor without an accident.

In February 1846, James E. Johnson was the pilot keeper and appetence on the 70-foot pilot boat William J. Romer. James was the cousin of Josiah Johnson. The boat was selected to sail across the Atlantic, for a faster trip than with conventional Packet boats. The trans-Atlantic trip took them to Cork, Ireland.

Edmund Blunt

Johnson was ship master on several pilot boats. In the gale of 1852, Johnson brought the ship Areole safely into port.

Johnson was pilot and an owner of the pilot boat Edmund Blunt, that was built in 1858 by Edward F. Williams. He was registered as master "Josiah Johnson Jr.," of the Edmund Blunt, No. 2, from 1876 to 1900. The Blunt survived the Great Blizzard of 1888.

American Civil War
During the American Civil War Johnson was a pilot on the steamship Marion. He carried troops, including the 13th Regiment Armory, to Annapolis, Maryland.

He contributed funds for the purchase of new pilot boats for the pilots to replace the James Funk and William Bell, that were captured by the rebel steamer CSS Tallahassee.

Sandy Hook Pilot Boat Company
In 1883, Johnson was friends with Captain Joseph Henderson, Henry Sdquine, William J. Barry, and Captain Walter Brewer. On August 30, 1883, they started the Sandy Hook Pilot Boat Company to have ownership and control of vessels and equipment for the use of pilots in the New York Harbor and water ways of Sandy Hook. They received a certificate of incorporation from Albany, New York. The capital stock raised was $100,000, which was to be invested in pilot boats and other equipment. Their office was in Burling-slip in New York City. There was opposition to the project as it was seen as forming a union. The new Sandy Hook Pilot Boat company intended to influence legislation of a bill to reduce the pilot fees. The reduction of fees for pilotage had been on the table in earlier years. In November 1879, Brewer, Johnson and Augustus Van Pelt were on a committee to confer with merchants and shipowners regarding the pilotage charges.

On May 20, 1888, Johnson was reported as a trustee of the New York and Sandy Hook Pilots' Mutual Benefit Society.

Johnson celebrated his 74th birthday on May 4, 1903. He was described as "one of the best-known harbor navigators alive" and as six feet in height and weighed over 200 pounds. He was a member of the Marcy Avenue Baptist Church in Brooklyn. He retired from the pilot service in 1904.

Death

Johnson died on August 21, 1919, at age 87, in Stamford, Connecticut. His funeral took place at chapel of Chester Gardner on Green Avenue in Brooklyn. New York and New Jersey pilots were invited to attend. His interment was at the Green-Wood Cemetery in Brooklyn.

See also

 List of Northeastern U. S. Pilot Boats

References

1919 deaths
1832 births
People from Brooklyn
Maritime pilotage
Sea captains
Burials at Green-Wood Cemetery